The following is a list of attacks on state or national legislatures.

19th century or earlier

20th century

21st century

See also 

 List of attacks on high courts

References 

Lists of events